Vypin (Cochin Portuguese: Isla Santa) is one of the group of islands that form part of the city of Kochi (Cochin), in the Indian state of Kerala. Vypin forms a barrier island which lies between the Arabian Sea in the west and the Cochin backwaters formed by the various distributaries of Periyar river, in the east. The northernmost end of the island lies on the estuary of the Periyar river in Muziris (Kodungallur), and the southernmost end in the mouth of the Cochin Backwaters in Kalamukku near Fort Vypin. Vypin is 58th most densely populated islands in the world. Njarakkal is one of the most densely populated locations within Vypin.

Development
At far the northern tip of Vypin, is home to the Munambam Fishing Harbour, the largest fishing harbour in Kochi. Puthuvype has become the major industrial hub in Kerala and the fastest growing city suburb due to the SPM project run by Kochi Refineries, an offshore pumping station of Kochi Port, the Puthuvyp LNG Terminal, the IOC Bottling Plant and the proposed Oceanarium.

There are ten lighthouses in Kerala, one of which is situated at Puthuvype Beach and is the tallest in Kerala

India's first international container trans-shipment terminal (ICTT) in the Special Economic Zone at Vallarpadam Island, designed to handle the largest container ships, was opened by then Prime Minister Manmohan Singh on February 11, 2011.

There are regular boat services from Fort Kochi to Vypin Island. In 2004 a bridge was built by the Goshree Islands Development Authority (GIDA) to connect Vypin to the mainland. The Goshree bridges also connect the islands Mulavukad and Vallarpadam.

Vypin is now a fast-developing suburb of Kochi City. Today, all the basic infrastructure of modern living is available in Vypin. Travellers from North Kerala can use the Vypin–Munambam state highway to reach Ernakulam.

History
The island was formed in 1341 following a heavy flood.

Villages of Vypin
 Cherai
 Edavanakkad
 Elamkunnapuzha
 Fort Vypin
 Kuzhuppilly
 Malippuram
 Munambam
 Murikumpadam
 Nayarambalam
 Nedungad
 Njarackal
 Ochanthuruth
 Pallippuram
 Perumpilly
 Puthuvype

See also 

 1982 Vypeen hooch tragedy
 Mulavukad Grama Panchayat
 Njarackal

External links 

Geography of Kochi
Islands of Kerala
Neighbourhoods in Kochi
Islands of India
Populated places in India